Inger or Ingvar (Old Norse: Yngvarr; Greek: Ινγρος Μαρτινακιος, Ingros Martinakios; c. 814 - after 870) was a Byzantine Varangian soldier, politician and courtier of Nordic origin. In the service of Amorian emperors, Theophilos and Michael III, he rose to distinction in the military and ultimately became a senator in Constantinople. During the reign of Basil the Macedonian he served as a courtier before retiring to his estates and dying some time after 870. 

Inger married Melisenna Martinakia, a descendant of Heraclius, with whom he had several children including the future empress Eudokia Ingerina.

References

Varangians

9th-century Byzantine people

810s births

Year of birth uncertain

Year of death unknown